Bier is a German surname, meaning "beer". Notable people with the surname include:

August Bier (1861–1949), German surgeon and pioneer of anesthesiology
Martin Bier (1854–1934), German chess player
Steven Bier Jr. (born 1964), former stage name Madonna Wayne Gacy, former keyboard player for Marilyn Manson
Susanne Bier (born 1960), Danish film director
Vicki Bier, American American systems engineer and decision analyst

German-language surnames
Surnames from nicknames